Colymbetinae is a subfamily of predaceous diving beetles in the family Dytiscidae. There are about 11 genera and at least 130 described species in Colymbetinae.

Genera
These 11 genera belong to the subfamily Colymbetinae:
 Anisomeria Brinck, 1943 i c g
 Bunites Spangler, 1972 i c g
 Carabdytes Balke, Hendrich and Wewalka, 1992 i c g
 Colymbetes Clairville, 1806 i c g b
 Hoperius Fall, 1927 i c g b
 Meladema Laporte, 1835 i c g
 Melanodytes Seidlitz, 1887 i c g
 Neoscutopterus J. Balfour-Browne, 1943 i c g b
 Rhantus Dejean, 1833 i c g b
 Rugosus García, 2001 i c g
 Senilites Brinck, 1948 i c g
Data sources: i = ITIS, c = Catalogue of Life, g = GBIF, b = Bugguide.net

References

Further reading

External links

 

Dytiscidae
Articles created by Qbugbot